"Another Dumb Blonde" is the debut single from American singer Hoku. It was originally featured on the soundtrack to the 2000 Nickelodeon theatrical film Snow Day, and was released as a single from the soundtrack on January 18, 2000, by Geffen Records and Interscope Records. It was later featured on her eponymous debut album.

Music video
Directed by Tryan George, the video focuses on Hoku emailing a video to her ex-boyfriend telling him that she's not interested in him anymore. She shoots the video with her friends and new boyfriend at a beach party. Actors Mark Webber, Schuyler Fisk and Emmanuelle Chriqui (from Snow Day) appear in the video. Intercut in the video are scenes of Hoku and some dancers dancing behind a winter mountain background and scenes from the film that focus on the romantic subplot.

Chart performance 
The single peaked at number 27 on the Billboard Hot 100, becoming Hoku's first and only song to reach the Top 40. It sold 600,000 copies domestically, making it the fourteenth best-selling single of 2000.

Charts

References

External links

2000 songs
2000 debut singles
Hoku songs
Geffen Records singles
Interscope Records singles
Songs written by Antonina Armato
Songs written by Tim James (musician)
Songs written for films